The Xi Chapter, Psi Upsilon Fraternity is a fraternity chapter at Wesleyan University in Middletown, Connecticut.  Its 1891 building, the Psi Upsilon Fraternity Building, is an architecturally significant example of Romanesque and Jacobethan architecture, and was listed on the National Register of Historic Places in 2009.

Chapter history
The Psi Upsilon fraternity was founded in 1833;  its Wesleyan chapter was founded in about 1843.  By the late 19th century, the chapter was one of the leading fraternities on the campus: its members were often leaders of the school's sports teams, and won many academic awards.

Building
The Psi Upsilon fraternity house is located on the Fraternity Row on the east side of the central Wesleyan campus, at the southeast corner of High and College Streets.  It is a distinctive 2-1/2 story masonry structure, built mainly with load-bearing yellow brick, and trimmed in a variety of materials, including brownstone and terra cotta. There is stuccoed half-timbering in its gable ends.  Most window openings have segmented-arch tops, with brick headers and brownstone sills.  The building corners are finished in darker stone or brick in quoining patterns.  The building interior is largely reflective of a major restyling done in 1916.

The building was designed by Colin Wilson, an English architect, who was chosen over competitors including the noted New York firm Carrère and Hastings.  Wilson, who was then young and relatively unknown, may have been chosen due to an association with a London-based alumnus who funded much of the building's construction cost.

References

External links

National Register of Historic Places in Middlesex County, Connecticut
Romanesque Revival architecture in Connecticut
Buildings and structures completed in 1891
Middletown, Connecticut
Fraternity and sorority houses